Vergil D. Reed (1897 – April 9, 1986) was an American advertising executive and academic.

Reed was raised in Delaware County, Indiana, and graduated from Indiana University in 1922. Reed then completed a master's degree and doctorate from Columbia Business School. He worked for the J. Walter Thompson Company from 1944 to 1958. Reed taught at Michigan State University and Boston University. In 1941, Reed was elected a fellow of the American Statistical Association. From 1962 to 1965, Reed was a member of the Columbia Graduate Business School of Business. He retired from academia and consultancy work in 1965. Reed died on April 9, 1986 of pneumonia in Washington, D.C.

References

1897 births
1986 deaths
People from Delaware County, Indiana
Indiana University Bloomington alumni
Columbia Business School alumni
Columbia University faculty
Michigan State University faculty
Boston University faculty
Deaths from pneumonia in Washington, D.C.
Fellows of the American Statistical Association